Jordan "Jerry" Ragovoy (September 4, 1930 – July 13, 2011) was an American songwriter and record producer.

His best-known composition "Time Is on My Side" (written under the pseudonym of Norman Meade) was made famous by the Rolling Stones, although it had been recorded earlier by Kai Winding and Irma Thomas. Ragovoy also wrote "Stay With Me", which was originally recorded by Lorraine Ellison and made famous by Bette Midler in her film The Rose. It was also performed by Mary J. Blige at the 49th Grammy Awards.

He also wrote "Piece of My Heart" which became a significant hit for Big Brother and the Holding Company, featuring Janis Joplin. During the 1960s, Ragovoy "helped mould the new African-American sound of soul music", according to the obituary in The Guardian. During this venture, he co-wrote the Afro-pop dance song "Pata Pata" with Miriam Makeba; the song became a major hit for Makeba and was covered by numerous other artists.

He was the founder of The Hit Factory.

Early life and career 

Ragovoy was born in Philadelphia, Pennsylvania, the son of a Hungarian-born Jewish optometrist. He entered record production in 1953 with "My Girl Awaits Me" by the Castelles.

Another well-known song by Ragovoy is "Piece of My Heart", co-written with Bert Berns and recorded originally by Erma Franklin, and later famously covered by Big Brother and the Holding Company, featuring Janis Joplin. Between 1966 and 1968, Ragovoy was employed as producer and songwriter for the Warner Bros subsidiary Loma Records. He also co-wrote several songs in Janis Joplin's solo career, including "Try (Just a Little Bit Harder)" (originally by Lorraine Ellison on Loma Records), "Cry Baby" (originally by Garnet Mimms and the Enchanters), "Get it While You Can" (originally by Howard Tate, covered by Joplin) and "My Baby". In 1984, Ragovoy written "Tell Me What Can I Do", a duet sang by Crystal Gayle and Hong Kong singer Danny Chan.

Prior to Joplin's death, Ragovoy wrote a song especially for her next album, titled "I'm Gonna Rock My Way to Heaven".  The song was never recorded or performed until shortly before Ragovoy's death in July 2011, when it was included in the theatrical production A Night with Janis Joplin,  written and directed by Randy Johnson with arrangements and musical direction by Len Rhodes.  Ragovoy was in attendance on opening night when the show premiered at Portland Center Stage on 27 May 2011.

Later career
Ragovoy also produced recorded work by Bonnie Raitt and Milkwood. However, his involvement in the music industry was less prolific from the 1970s onwards.

In 1968 Ragovoy created and was the original owner of the famous world class recording complex HIT FACTORY STUDIOS in Manhattan hosting numerous well known R&R artists.

In 1973, he won a Grammy Award as producer on Best Score From an Original Cast Show Album, for Don't Bother Me, I Can't Cope.

In 1974, Ragovoy teamed up with Dionne Warwick to produce her Then Came You album, which peaked at No. 35 in the US Billboard R&B albums chart.

In 2003, Ragovoy worked again with Howard Tate. The pair returned with an acclaimed CD, Howard Tate Rediscovered, written, arranged and produced by Ragovoy.

In 2008, Ace Records released a compilation album entitled, The Jerry Ragovoy Story: Time Is on My Side.

In 2012, Ragovoy was portrayed by actor Brad Garrett in the film Not Fade Away.

Death
Ragovoy died, following a stroke, on July 13, 2011, at the age of 80.

Notable compositions

References

External links
Discography of Loma Records 

1930 births
2011 deaths
Songwriters from Pennsylvania
Record producers from Pennsylvania
Musicians from Philadelphia
Place of death missing
Grammy Award winners
American people of Hungarian-Jewish descent